Meall Mheinnidh (722 m) is a mountain in the Northwest Highlands of Scotland. It lies in the Wester Ross region, north of Loch Maree.

A very remote peak, it is characterised by its very steep northern face, like its neighbours Beinn Lair and Beinn Airigh Charr. The nearest village is Poolewe to the west.

References

Marilyns of Scotland
Grahams
Mountains and hills of the Northwest Highlands